This article presents the discography of Shirley Bassey.

Bassey's biggest selling solo albums are The Shirley Bassey Singles Album, peaking at number two and earning a gold disc, and the limited edition double album, Shirley Bassey 25th Anniversary Album, a platinum record charting at number three in 1978 on the UK Albums Chart. Her Top 10 album Something is her biggest-selling studio album, remaining in the UK Albums Chart for five months. In 2020, the album I Owe It All to You entered the UK Top 5, and Bassey became “the first female artist to claim a Top 40 album in seven consecutive decades.”

Bassey's highest peaking single in the US is "Goldfinger", peaking at number eight on the Billboard Hot 100 and appearing on the number one soundtrack album from  the 1964 James Bond film. Bassey has two number one UK singles to her credit: "As I Love You" and the double A-sided, "Reach for the Stars" / "Climb Ev'ry Mountain", as well as a number one on the dance chart; "History Repeating" in 1997. She reached the top spot on the Australian and South African charts with 1973's "Never, Never, Never". On the release of "The Living Tree" in 2007, she marked a 50 year span of appearances in the UK Singles Chart.

Although her only solo album to enter the Top 20 of a US chart (R&B) is Live at Carnegie Hall, she has enjoyed five Top 10 singles on US charts over the decades: "Goldfinger" (Billboard Hot 100 Top 10); "Something"; "Never, Never, Never"; "History Repeating" and "Get the Party Started".

Studio albums

Live albums

Compilation albums

Other notable albums

Singles

EPs

Original soundtrack recordings

Notes

References

Discographies of British artists
Pop music discographies